Sidney Mark Ujakpor Sánchez (born 18 January 1987 in Spain) is a Spanish athlete specializing in the 400 metres and 400 metres hurdles. His coach is David López Capapé, former 400 metres hurdler and orthopaedic surgeon.

He has a Nigerian father and a Spanish mother.

Competition record

Personal bests
Outdoor
400 metres – 46.15 (Madrid 2014)
400 metres hurdles - 49.65 (Rio de Janeiro 2016)
Indoor
400 metres – 46.49  (Sabadell 2012)

References

1987 births
Living people
Athletes from Madrid
Spanish male sprinters
Spanish sportspeople of African descent
Spanish people of Nigerian descent
Sportspeople of Nigerian descent
European Championships (multi-sport event) bronze medalists
European Athletics Championships medalists
Mediterranean Games gold medalists for Spain
Mediterranean Games silver medalists for Spain
Mediterranean Games medalists in athletics
Athletes (track and field) at the 2009 Mediterranean Games
Athletes (track and field) at the 2013 Mediterranean Games
Athletes (track and field) at the 2018 Mediterranean Games
European Games competitors for Spain
Athletes (track and field) at the 2019 European Games
People from Ceuta